Mount Auburn Cemetery is a historic African American cemetery and national historic district in Baltimore, Maryland, United States. Overlooking the Middle Branch of the Patapsco River to the east, Baltimore's Downtown to the north and railroad tracks to the south, Mt. Auburn Cemetery is surrounded by the Cherry Hill, Westport, Mt. Winans and Lakeland communities.

History
One of the most historic and largest African American cemeteries in Baltimore, Mt. Auburn Cemetery was formed in 1872, by the Reverend James Peck in protest to segregation against the White Methodist Church.  Its grounds encompass  and holds more than 55,000 interred.

Designated on the local and national historic registers, the cemetery was once known as "The City of the Dead for Colored People" since it was the only place a person of color could be buried.  Once part of a farm, the land was given to the Methodist Church and assigned to the Sharp Street Memorial United Methodist Church to oversee its grounds.   Over the years the cemetery has been in total neglect with only a few of its front acreage remaining identifiable as a cemetery.

Mt. Auburn Cemetery holds the remains of some of Baltimore's and the nation's "movers and shakers" of the local civil rights movement.  In addition to runaway slaves, the cemetery contains the remains of the first African American ship chandler; clergymen; the first female funeral home director, Civil War and civil rights activists, lawyers, doctors, teachers, military veterans, founders of national fraternities’ and sororities’  and the ancestors of thousands of African-American families.

Mount Auburn Cemetery was added to the National Register of Historic Places in 2001.

Notable interments
 Joe Gans (1874-1910), first African American lightweight boxing champion of the world (1901-1908).
 William Ashbie Hawkins (1862-1941), early African American bishop in the African Methodist Church, and one of Baltimores first African American lawyers.
 Lillie Mae Carroll Jackson (1889-1975), pioneering civil rights activist who brought the National Association for the Advancement of Colored People to Baltimore and was its leader for 35 years.
 Edgar Amos Love (September 10, 1891 – May 1, 1974), one of three founders of Omega Psi Phi Fraternity, Inc.

References

External links

, including photo dated 1997, at Maryland Historical Trust
The Historical Marker Database, Mount Auburn Cemetery Marker
"Mobtown Beat: The Plot Sickens, Mount Auburn Cemetery Is Still In Shambles," By Jason Torres, Baltimore City Paper, Posted May 30, 2007.
 Historic images of Mt. Auburn cemetery from the Afro-American newspaper
Why Are Black & White Funeral Homes STILL Separate? documentary short recorded at Mount Auburn Cemetery (2020)

Cemeteries on the National Register of Historic Places in Maryland
Cemeteries in Baltimore
Historic districts on the National Register of Historic Places in Baltimore
African-American cemeteries
African-American history in Baltimore
Westport, Baltimore
Baltimore City Landmarks